KGNB (1420 AM, 103.1 FM) is an American terrestrial radio station, paired with an FM translator, broadcasting a country music format. Licensed to New Braunfels, Texas, the station serves the San Antonio area.  The station is currently owned by New Braunfels Communications, Inc. and features programming from Fox News Radio.

History
KGNB was initially proposed by the Comal Broadcasting Company in January 1949. A construction permit was granted to build a 1 kilowatt daytime facility on the east side of U.S. Highway 81, 2 miles east of the city limits of New Braunfels. The studio location was originally located at 186 Castell in New Braunfels.

The facility was constructed and received a License to Cover from the Federal Communications Commission on May 22, 1950.

References

External links

GNB
Sports radio stations in the United States
Radio stations established in 1963
1963 establishments in Texas